Upper Fishing Lake is a lake in the east-central part of the Canadian province of Saskatchewan in Narrow Hills Provincial Park. It is situated in a glacier-formed valley in the Cub Hills and the boreal forest ecozone of Canada. It is located north-west of the larger Lower Fishing Lake along the course of Caribou Creek and is accessed from the Hanson Lake Road. Caribou Creek, and the lake's other inflow, a river that flows south from Stickley Lake, flow into the lake at its north-western point. Caribou Creek flows out of the lake at its south-eastern point. The Fishing Lakes Fire of 1977 burned much of the region upstream and around the lake. As a result, the area is now dominated by jack pine, which is a tree species that is well adapted fire burned forests.

At the south-east corner of the lake, near where Caribou Creek flows out, is Caribou Creek Lodge. The lodge is accessed from Hanson Lake Road and features a motel, cabins, a dining room, fuel, and a convenience store.

Fish species 
Fish commonly found in Upper Fishing Lake include northern pike and walleye.

See also 
List of lakes of Saskatchewan
List of protected areas of Saskatchewan
Tourism in Saskatchewan
Hudson Bay drainage basin

References 

Lakes of Saskatchewan
Northern Saskatchewan Administration District